Operation Ikarus (Unternehmen  Ikarus or Fall  Ikarus in German) was a World War II German plan to invade Iceland, which had been occupied by British forces during Operation Fork in 1940. The plan was never realized.

The purpose of the British move was to prevent a German invasion of the island. The German plan was not realized due to the delay of Operation Sea Lion (Unternehmen Seelöwe) and, even though an invasion of Iceland was considered possible, defense and resupply was not.

German plan

The German plan for invasion may have involved the German passenger ships Europa and Bremen. These ships were also considered for use in Operation Sea Lion, another planned German invasion which also never came.

See also
Expansion operations and planning of the Axis Powers
Iceland during World War II
Operation Fork - British invasion of Iceland
Operation Weserübung - German invasion of Denmark and Norway
History of Iceland

References

Ikarus
Military history of Iceland during World War II
Ikarus
Ikarus